Etag can refer to:

 HTTP ETag, entity tag, part of the HTTP protocol for the World Wide Web
 , the  utility that comes with Emacs
 NERC Tag, also known as E-Tag, a transaction on the North American bulk electricity market
 e-TAG, an electronic tolling system used on tollways in Australia
 European Technology Assessment Group, a network of scientific institutions
 European Technical Approval Guidelines, drafted by the European Organisation for Technical Approvals